FP Markets (First Prudential Markets) is an Australian contract for differences (CFDs) and forex trading broker headquartered in Sydney at Exchange House 10 Bridge in the adjoining building to the Australian Securities Exchange (ASX).

History
FP Markets was founded in Sydney, Australia in 2005 after receiving an Australian Financial Services Licence from the Australian Securities and Investments Commission ("ASIC").

In 2016, FP Markets was one of a number of retail forex brokers in Australia who lobbied against new client money laws proposed by the Australian government.

In 2018, First Prudential Markets was licensed by the Cyprus Securities and Exchange Commission.

In 2018, FP Markets Secured a Sponsorship Deal with South African golf academy, ASM Academy.

Founder Matthew Murphie is also on the board of the Australian CFD & FX Association.

In 2019, FP Markets was awarded the Best Global Forex Value Broker Award at the Global Forex Award held in Limassol, Cyprus.

On 12 May 2020, FP Markets was named as the Forex and CFDs broker with the "Best for Quality of Trade Execution in 2019", that was announced in the internationally recognized Investment Trends 2019 Australia Leverage Trading Report

References

External links
 First Prudential Markets (FPM) Homepage
 First Prudential Markets (EU) Homepage

Financial derivative trading companies
Financial services companies of Australia
Investment companies of Australia
Companies based in Sydney

da:Differencekontrakt
de:Differenzkontrakt
it:Contratto per differenza
pl:Contract for difference
ru:Контракт на разницу цен